Tony Aslangul (21 June 1923 – 3 January 2000) was an Australian alpine skier. He competed in two events at the 1956 Winter Olympics.

References

1923 births
2000 deaths
Australian male alpine skiers
Olympic alpine skiers of Australia
Alpine skiers at the 1956 Winter Olympics
Sportspeople from Paris